Here Be Monsters is a studio album by Norwegian rock band Motorpsycho, released on 12 February, 2016, through Stickman Records and Rune Grammofon. The album is available as a vinyl, CD and a digital download.

Track listing

Personnel
Motorpsycho
Bent Sæther - Bass, guitar, vocals, producer
Hans Magnus Ryan - Guitar, vocals, flute (on track 3)
 Kenneth Kapstad - Drums

Additional musicians
Thomas Henriksen - Keyboard, vocals, engineer

References

2016 albums
Motorpsycho albums